A Kofler bench, or Kofler heating bar; Kofler hot bar; Kofler hot bench, in German, Kofler-Heizbank, is a metal strip with a temperature gradient (range room temperature to 300°C). Any substance can be placed on a section of the strip revealing its thermal behaviour at the temperature at that point.  The gradient is engineered to be approximately linear.

This melting-point apparatus for use with a microscope was developed by the Austrian pharmacognosist Ludwig Kofler (30 November 1891 Dornbirn - 23 August 1951 Innsbruck) and his wife mineralogist Adelheid Kofler. In 1936, the Koflers and Mayrhofer published their "Mikroskopische Methoden in der Mikrochemie" [Kofler, L., A. Kofler and Mayrhofer, A. (1936)], Kofler and Kofler published their "Thermomikromethoden" [Kofler L., and A. Kofler (1954)] in 1954. The integration of microscope and Kofler bench is known as the Kofler hot stage microscope.

Kofler, his wife Adelheid, and their colleague, Maria Kuhnert-Brandstätter, investigated numerous organic molecules, and published some 250 papers describing their work.

Thermomicroscopy, incepted by Ludwig and Adelheid Kofler and developed further by Maria Kuhnert-Brandstätter (1919–2011) and Walter C. McCrone used the technique for studying the phases of solid drug substances.

See also
Melting point

References

Further reading

External links
Department of Pharmacognosy at the University of Innsbruck

Measuring instruments
Microscopy